Golaidanga High School
Golaidanga High School is a secondary school located in Golaidanga village at Balodhara Union under Singair Upazila in Manikgonj District, Bangladesh.  It was founded in 1967 by the local scholar Md. Mohar Ali (1945-2020).
Golaidanga High School offers a coeducation system. The institute has three disciplines: Science, Humanities and Business studies. The EIIN is 111066 and MPO number is 2807101303, under the Dhaka Education Board. The average exam pass rate of the institute is: 76.8% for JSC and 84.53% for SSC.

References

High schools in Bangladesh
Schools in Manikganj District
1967 establishments in East Pakistan
Educational institutions established in 1967